The second season of Sense8, an American science fiction drama streaming television series created by Lana and Lilly Wachowski and J. Michael Straczynski, follows eight strangers from different parts of the world who suddenly become "sensates"; human beings who are mentally and emotionally linked. The season was produced for Netflix by Lana Wachowski and her wife's Venus Castina Productions and Straczynski's Studio JMS, along with Georgeville Television and Elizabeth Bay Productions. Unpronounceable Productions was set up to oversee production for the show since the first season.

A multinational ensemble cast starring Doona Bae, Jamie Clayton, Tina Desai, Tuppence Middleton, Toby Onwumere, Max Riemelt, Miguel Ángel Silvestre, and Brian J. Smith portrays the suddenly connected strangers. Onwumere replaced season 1 star Aml Ameen, who left the show in March 2016 during its filming. Freema Agyeman, Terrence Mann, Anupam Kher, Naveen Andrews, Daryl Hannah also star.  The episodes' scripts were written by Lana Wachowski and Straczynski, with the exception of the series finale which was written by Lana, David Mitchell, and Aleksandar Hemon. The majority of them were directed by Lana Wachowski, with the remainder being divided between the Wachowskis' frequent collaborators James McTeigue, Tom Tykwer, and Dan Glass. It was filmed in Belgium, Brazil, France, Germany, India, Italy, Kenya, Malta, Mexico, the Netherlands, South Korea, the UK, and the US.

On August 8, 2015, Netflix announced that it had renewed the show for a second season. Netflix released the first episode of the second season, a two-hour Christmas special, on December 23, 2016; the remaining 10 episodes of the season were released on May 5, 2017. Following Netflix's decision to cancel the series, a two-and-a-half-hour finale was released on June 8, 2018, as the twelfth episode of the season. The season was overall met with positive critical reception and received a Primetime Emmy Award nomination for Outstanding Cinematography for a Single-Camera Series (One Hour) and two nominations by the GLAAD Media Awards for Outstanding Drama Series and Outstanding TV Movie or Limited Series for the season proper and series finale, respectively.

Cast

Main

The August 8th cluster 
 Doona Bae as Sun Bak, daughter of a powerful Seoul businessman and a burgeoning star in the underground kickboxing world. Jaein Lee portrays a young Sun.
 Jamie Clayton as Nomi Marks, a trans woman hacktivist and blogger living in San Francisco with her girlfriend Amanita. She chose the name Nomi to stand for "Know Me".
 Tina Desai as Kala Rasal (née Dandekar), a university-educated pharmacist and devout Hindu in Mumbai who is engaged to marry a man she does not love.
 Tuppence Middleton as Riley Blue (née Gunnarsdóttir), an Icelandic DJ living in London who is trying to escape a troubled past.
 Toby Onwumere as Capheus "Van Damn" Onyango, a matatu driver in Nairobi and a passionate fan of Jean-Claude Van Damme who is trying to earn money to buy AIDS medicine for his mother. Gabriel Ouma portrays a young Capheus.
 Max Riemelt as Wolfgang Bogdanow, a Berlin locksmith and safe-cracker who has unresolved issues with his late father and participates in organized crime. Mathis Wernecke and Lasse Bergmann portray a younger Wolfgang.
 Miguel Ángel Silvestre as Lito Rodriguez, a closeted actor of Spanish background living in Mexico City with his boyfriend Hernando. Ramiro Cid portrays a young Lito.
 Brian J. Smith as Will Gorski, a Chicago police officer haunted by an unsolved murder from his childhood. Speaking about the Wachowskis picking names that carry a significance for their characters, Smith said about "Will": "The whole idea of Will Gorski, the idea of someone who's got this drive to act and to do, not just to be done to. It's very central to Will's character." Maxwell Jenkins portrays a young Will.

Other regulars
 Freema Agyeman as Amanita "Neets" Caplan, Nomi's girlfriend, who later becomes an ally for the new sensates.
 Terrence Mann as Milton Bailey "Whispers" Brandt, a sensate who turned against his own kind and who is part of an organization determined to neutralize sensates, known as the Biologic Preservation Organization (BPO).
 Anupam Kher as Sanyam Dandekar, Kala's loving father, a chef and restaurant owner.
 Naveen Andrews as Jonas Maliki, a sensate from a different cluster who wants to help the newly-born cluster of sensates.
 Daryl Hannah as Angelica "Angel" Turing, a sensate from the same cluster as Jonas, who becomes the "mother" of the new sensates' cluster as she activates their psychic connection.

Recurring
The recurring actors are listed by the region in which they first appear.

 In Seoul, South Korea
 Son Suk-ku as Detective Mun
 Youn Yuh-jung as Min-Jung
 Lee Ki-chan as Joong-Ki Bak
 Sara Sohn as Soo-Jin
 San Sohn as Lina
In San Francisco, California, United States of America
 Michael Sommers as Bug
 Maximilienne Ewalt as Grace
 Anthony Cistaro as Agent Jeffrey Bendix
 Annie Munch as Teagan Marks
 Rhonnie Washington as Dad #1
 Michael Willis as Dad #2
 L. Trey Wilson as Dad #3
In Mumbai, Maharashtra, India
 Purab Kohli as Rajan Rasal
 Rajiv Kachroo as Vikram
 Sid Makkar as Ajay Kapoor
 Natasha Rastogi as Priya Dandekar
 Mita Vashisht as Sahana Rasal
 Shruti Bapna as Devi
 Huzan Mewawala as Daya Dandekar
In London, England, United Kingdom
 Satya Bhabha as Habib
 Clive Wood as Richard Wilson Croome
 Jason Thorpe as The Secretary
 Aidan McArdle as Mitchell Taylor
 In Nairobi, Kenya
 Paul Ogola as Jela
 Mumbi Maina as Zakia Asalache
 Chichi Seii as Shiro
 Peter King Mwania as Silas Kabaka
 Rosa Katanu as Amondi Kabaka
 Abdu Simba as Koman Nyagah
 Nini Wacera as Justice Abdu
 Elsaphan Njora as Nailah
 In Berlin, Germany
 Maximilian Mauff as Felix Bernner
 Valeria Bilello as Lila Facchini
 Lars Eidinger as Sebastian Fuchs
 Martin Wuttke as Volker Bohm
 Akira Koieyama as Maitake
In Mexico City, Mexico
 Alfonso Herrera as Hernando Fuentes
 Eréndira Ibarra as Daniela Velázquez
 Tony Dalton as Lito's agent
In Chicago, Illinois, United States of America
 Ness Bautista as Diego Morales
 John Judd as Professor Kolovi
 Janet Ulrich Brooks as Carol Cumberland
 Joe Pantoliano as Michael Gorski
In Amsterdam, The Netherlands
Kick Gurry as Puck
Sylvester McCoy as Old Man of Hoy
 Sarah Kants as Bodhi
In the woods of California, United States of America
 Ben Cole as Todd W. McCarver
 Erik Hayser as Raoul Pasquale
 Teresa Navarro as Additional cluster member
In Cambridgeshire, England, United Kingdom 
 Annabelle Dowler as Elizabeth
 Anya McKenna Bruce as Chelsea

Episodes

Production

Casting 
On April 26, 2016, Deadline Hollywood reported that Aml Ameen abruptly left production a couple of episodes into filming of the second season over a conflict with Lana Wachowski that started during the table read for the season and progressively got worse. Both the Deadline article and Ameen's co-star on Sense8, Tuppence Middleton, suggested the conflict was over creative differences. When asked about it, Straczynski commented he was not there to know what happened between Ameen and Lana but he respects the choices of both. Subsequent to Ameen's departure, the role of Capheus was recast to Toby Onwumere after a seven-day auditioning process. Onwumere watched a few episodes of the show to prepare for his audition, as he had not seen it before. The actor said about his approach to the character: "My duty [was] not to emulate exactly what [Ameen] has done, ... but just to give it my own spin, and kind of do my own thing, and just give this character the same essence, but ... maybe a different life and a different take on it." Lana described the unexpected change of the actors as "beautiful" and "perfect", commenting that it complimented her effort to explore the nature of identity in the series. She elaborated that in her opinion Ameen was an actor that was "quite good at being innocent and boyish" and Onwumere had similar qualities but was also someone that was "ready to ... become a political leader ... and also fall in love and be sort of sensual with another body", storylines that are explored in the second season of the show.

Earlier in April, Kick Gurry, who had played parts in the Wachowskis' Speed Racer and Jupiter Ascending in the past, revealed he had been cast in the second season, after Lana called to inform him that they had written a role specifically for him. In May, Deadline Hollywood reported Ben Cole had been cast as Todd, a sensate who would rather be "normal". In September, Sylvester McCoy reportedly revealed he filmed three or four episodes of the second season of a Netflix show, later identified to be Sense8, and has signed to appear in further seasons if he is wanted. Martin Wuttke, who had minor roles in Cloud Atlas, also joined the cast in the second season.

Filming and locations 
To properly tell the international aspects of the story, filming for Sense8 took place almost entirely on location around the globe. For the second season, production credited 16 cities located in 11 countries for having been part of the filming. The major locations they filmed in, include all of the first season's except Reykjavík, and the following new ones: Amsterdam, Argyll, Chippenham, Los Angeles, Malta, Positano, Redwoods, and São Paulo. Production start for the main unit of the second season was given an expected date of March 2016, but a separate shoot involving the principal actors began on December 30, 2015, in Berlin, to capture footage during the Christmas holidays. This was followed by a short two-day shoot in Chicago, on January 23 and 24, 2016. Filming resumed in Berlin in the middle of March 2016, and proceeded to Mumbai on March 25, for a 10-day shoot. On April 7, filming started in Positano. Aml Ameen did not participate in the filming, as he had decided to depart from the production. Later in April, filming moved to Mexico, with Toby Onwumere replacing the departed Ameen, and specifically to Mexico City, and for one day in Metepec. Filming in California, San Francisco, began around May 5, and lasted up to May 20. Location manager Matthew Riutta was fined by the Department of Parks and Recreation when "someone accidentally got naked", during a romantic scene set at the tree swing in Billy Goat Hill. A short two-day shoot in Los Angeles, Malibu followed, starting May 24. Filming in São Paulo took place in late May, and specifically in its 20th Gay Pride Parade on May 29. Participating in the event was a late decision taken by Lana two days before the Parade began, as the production had previously abandoned their plans for the location due to scheduling conflicts. When Lana realized she could make it fit, they flew to São Paulo and filmed in the event in front of a crowd of millions, unrehearsed. Filming in Chicago began on June 5, and wrapped up on June 15, then moved to the United Kingdom, in London, Cambridge (Chippenham Park), and Scotland (Ardkinglas Estate and Castle Stalker, for 9 days), and wrapped on July 4. Then, filming moved to the Netherlands, in Amsterdam, The Hague, and Utrecht, for about two weeks, up to July 19. In Amsterdam, they were the first production to film in the Rijksmuseum, with the real paintings of Rembrandt featured prominently in the scenes. Lana was told that insurance would never allow her to film there, but after writing an eight-page letter about what The Night Watch means to her and the importance of bringing art to the homes of those that are unable to go to Rijksmuseum, she eventually managed to get a permit. In Amsterdam's club Paradiso, they filmed Tuppence Middleton DJing with a real audience, and the rest of the cast dancing. After the Netherlands, filming proceeded to Nairobi as early as July 22, and later to South Korea, in Seoul and Bucheon, for the production's longest shoot, lasting about three weeks. Afterwards, filming moved to Berlin, until September 14, and during the same period, they also briefly returned to London to shoot outside the Houses of Parliament for two days. Filming then moved to Malta on September 18, for a two-day shoot, where they used the water tanks in Kalkara. On September 19, 2016, with the completion of the Malta shoot, filming for the second season came to an end. Overall, the cast and crew flew in excess of 250,000 miles to complete the season, while some directors and producers who also did location scouting flew as much as 370,000 miles.

Filming for the series finale took place in Berlin, Brussels, Naples, and Paris. Production began in Berlin on October 2, 2017, and moved to Brussels on October 12, where they filmed in Villers Abbey in Villers-la-Ville. The next day filming began in Paris, where they remained up to October 24. Around midnight of October 22, they filmed a four-minute fireworks show near the Eiffel Tower. Due to insufficient notices posted by the Paris City Hall, reportedly some Parisians were taken by surprise and mistook the sound of the fireworks for a terrorist attack. On October 25, production moved to Naples where it remained up to November 4. They donated €7,000 to the local community to thank them for the hospitality, and to fund the construction of a pedestrian plaza. Filming resumed in Berlin later in November, and wrapped on November 12, 2017. A picture of the clapperboard used by the production shows that they considered the special as the twelfth episode of season 2.

Music 
In the Christmas special episode "Happy F*cking New Year", a cover of Leonard Cohen's "Hallelujah" is featured, recorded by the Apollo Chorus of Chicago, with the lead vocalist being Daniel Martin Moore. The sequence, which depicts the San Francisco Gay Men's Chorus singing, was originally cut to a different cover of the song, but days before the deadline of completion the licensing deal fell through, and Stoller had to order a custom version to be conducted to match their completed cut. The song was ready in five days, and the producers were happy with the end result, including Netflix, which made the song a prominent feature of the special's marketing campaign. For the fifth episode of the season, "Fear Never Fixed Anything", Mounsey created a remix of "What's Up?" to be played by Riley in a club, recalling the first season's appearance of the song.

Finale 
On June 1, 2017, Netflix announced that they had cancelled the series, despite preliminary negotiations with the writers and cast for a third season. However, on June 29, 2017, it was announced that due to strong fan demand, a two-hour series finale would be produced. A release date of June 8, 2018 and a final running time of 151 minutes were reported later. The episode ends with a title card that dedicates it to the fans of the show.

Reception

Critical reception and popularity 
Sense8 continued to be positively received in its second season. Rotten Tomatoes, a review aggregator website, indexed 15 reviews for the early released Christmas special, and reported an 87% critical approval rating for it, with an average rating of 6.88/10. The website assigned the following consensus to the special: "Sense8 serves up a heaping helping of yuletide queerness and sci-fi slyness in this narratively messy but richly felt special." Based on 28 reviews, Rotten Tomatoes assigned the 10 episodes that followed the special a critical approval rating of 93%, with an average rating of 7.57/10. The critical consensus reads, "Sense8 maintains its stunning visuals, Wachowski wackiness, and great heart -- though its individual characters deserve more development." On Metacritic, which uses a weighted average, the season was assigned a score of 73 out of 100, based on 8 reviews, indicating "generally favorable reviews". Rotten Tomatoes also collected 28 reviews for the series finale, and calculated a 93% critical approval rating, and an average rating of 7.15/10. The finale's critical consensus reads, "A hard fought coda to a beloved series, Sense8 epilogue exemplifies its strange, sensual, somewhat silly delights."

Netflix placed the second season of Sense8 at fifth place on their list for the year 2017 about couples where one of the two cannot resist to wait, and ends up watching episodes ahead of their significant other.

Accolades

Marketing 
On May 3, 2016, publicity stills of the ongoing production of the second season were posted online, accompanied by a short message by Lana Wachowski introducing the #Road2Sense8 hashtag under which new pictures would be posted. On December 3, 2016, the Christmas special episode was screened at São Paulo's Comic Con Experience, in advance of its Netflix premiere on December 23. The second episode of the second season was screened out of competition during the Series Mania festival in Paris, on April 18, 2017. On April 23, a screening of the second and third episodes took place in Chicago's Music Box Theatre, in a benefit for the American Civil Liberties Union, followed by Lana Wachowski taking questions from the audience, and again on April 26, in the red carpet premiere of the second season, at New York City's AMC Lincoln Square.

Several screenings of the series finale took place prior to its release on Netflix, on June 8, 2018. The first screening took place in The Music Box Theatre in Chicago, on May 25, as a benefit for EMILY's List, followed by a Q&A session with Lana and select cast members. The second screening took place in the Latin America Memorial in São Paulo, on June 1, with several cast members attending. The red carpet premiere followed in ArcLight Hollywood, in Los Angeles, on June 7. Linda Perry made a guest appearance to perform "What's Up?". Netflix organized an event for the fans on the day of the special's release, June 8, in Posillipo, in Naples, where a big portion of the special was filmed. Among other things, fans could try a slice of a special "Sense8" pizza that was created by famous pizza maker Gino Sorbillo with the help of the cast.

References

External links 
 
 

2016 American television seasons
2017 American television seasons